Amberlite is the tradename of a range of ion-exchange resins.

External links
 

Synthetic resins
Polyelectrolytes